Itararé is a municipality in the state of São Paulo in Brazil. The population is 50,642 (2020 est.) in an area of 1004 km². This place's name comes from the Tupi language, and means "stone that the river has dug" because the Itararé River runs partly underground. Itataré became an independent municipality in 1893, when it was separated from Itapeva da Faxina.

References

Municipalities in São Paulo (state)